General Charles Lennox, 4th Duke of Richmond, 4th Duke of Lennox, 4th Duke of Aubigny,  (9 December 176428 August 1819) was a Scottish peer, soldier, politician, and Governor-general of British North America.

Background
Richmond was born to General Lord George Lennox, the younger son of Charles Lennox, 2nd Duke of Richmond, and Lady Louisa, daughter of William Kerr, 4th Marquess of Lothian. His aunts included the famous four Lennox sisters.

Cricket
Richmond was a keen cricketer. He was an accomplished right-hand bat and a noted wicket-keeper. An amateur, he was a founder member of the Marylebone Cricket Club. In 1786, together with the Earl of Winchilsea, Richmond offered Thomas Lord a guarantee against any losses Lord might suffer on starting a new cricket ground. This led to Lord opening his first cricket ground in 1787. Although Lord's Cricket Ground has since moved twice, Richmond and Winchilsea's guarantee provided the genesis of the best-known cricket ground in the world, a ground known as the Home of Cricket. Nearly always listed as the Hon. Colonel Charles Lennox in contemporary scorecards, Richmond had 55 recorded first-class appearances from 1784 to 1800 and played a few more games after that.

Army general
Richmond became a British Army captain at the age of 23 in 1787. On 27 May 1789, while a colonel in the Duke of York's regiment, he was involved in a duel with Frederick, Duke of York, who had expressed the opinion that "Colonel Lennox had heard words spoken to him at Daughbigny's, to which no gentleman ought to have submitted", effectively an accusation of failing to respond to an insult in the way that a gentleman should. At Wimbledon Common, Richmond fired, but his ball "grazed his Royal Highness's curl"; the Duke did not fire. Richmond shortly after exchanged his company for the commission of a lieutenant-colonel in the 35th Regiment of Foot. On 1 July of the same year, he was involved in another duel, with Theophilus Swift, Esq., in consequence of a pamphlet criticising Richmond's character published under Swift's name. They met in a field near Uxbridge Road, where Swift was wounded in the body, but recovered. 

Later in the year, he married Lady Charlotte Gordon. In 1794 and 1795 he participated in naval engagements against the French in the West Indies and Gibraltar, but was sent home when he came into conflict with his superiors. He was also MP for Sussex, succeeding his father, from 1790 until he succeeded to the dukedom.

Duke
He became the 4th Duke of Richmond on 29 December 1806, after the death of his uncle, Charles Lennox, 3rd Duke of Richmond. In April 1807 he became Lord Lieutenant of Ireland. He remained in that post until 1813. He participated in the Napoleonic Wars and in 1815 he was in command of a reserve force in Brussels, which was protecting that city in case Napoleon won the Battle of Waterloo. On 15 June, the night before the Battle of Quatre Bras, his wife held a ball for his fellow officers. The glittering celebration became famous as the Duchess of Richmond's ball and was immortalised by William Makepeace Thackeray in Vanity Fair and by Lord Byron in Childe Harold's Pilgrimage.

Although the Duke observed the Battle of Quatre Bras the next day, as well as Waterloo on 18 June, he did not participate in either, his role being in the defence of the city of Brussels.

Governor General of Canada

In 1818 he was appointed Governor-general of British North America.

During the summer of 1819, Richmond was undertaking a tour of Upper and Lower Canada, when he was bitten on the hand by a fox. The injury apparently healed and he continued on the tour, but later in his journey the initial symptoms of hydrophobia appeared, a clear sign of Rabies. After the disease had developed rapidly, he died on 28 August. Richmond's body was returned to Quebec, where he was buried at the Cathedral of the Holy Trinity on 4 September.

The night before his death, he slept at the "Masonic Arms", which was renamed the "Duke of Richmond Arms" to commemorate the visit.

Richmond's title was inherited by his son, Charles Gordon-Lennox, 5th Duke of Richmond.

Legacy

 Richmond County, Nova Scotia
 Richmond, Ontario
 March Township, Ontario
 Huntley Township, Ontario
 Torbolton Township, Ontario
 Fitzroy Township, Ontario
 Earl of March Secondary School
 Lennoxville, Quebec
 Richmond, Quebec
 Richmond County, Nova Scotia
 Richmond Street in Toronto, Ontario
 Richmond Street in London, Ontario, 
According to tradition, the town of Richmond Village, Ontario, was also named after him, as he was said to have passed through the then village during his visit in 1819.

Richmond Park in Inchicore, Dublin, still bears his name. Now the home ground of St. Patrick's Athletic Football Club, it was once a part of Richmond Barracks as Richmond was Lord Lieutenant of Ireland (1807–1813). It was to these barracks that over 3,000 prisoners were brought after the 1916 Easter Rising in Dublin. After independence, the barracks were renamed Keogh Barracks and later redeveloped as housing for the capital's poor and again renamed Keogh Square.

Children

Richmond had fourteen children:

 Lady Mary Lennox (15 August 17907 December 1847), married Sir Charles Fitzroy and had issue.
 Charles Gordon-Lennox, 5th Duke of Richmond (3 August 179121 October 1860), married Lady Caroline Paget and had issue.
 Lt.-Col. Lord John George Lennox (3 October 179310 November 1873), married Louisa Rodney and had issue.
 Lady Sarah Lennox (c. 17948 September 1873), scandalised her family by eloping after Waterloo with Waterloo hero, General Peregrine Maitland, 17 years her senior. The courtship had gone unnoticed by her family. The Duke of Wellington arranged for the couple to be married in Paris and fostered the family's ultimate acceptance of the marriage.
 Lady Georgiana Lennox (30 September 179515 December 1891), was a close friend of the Duke of Wellington, despite being 26 years younger than the Duke who referred to her as "dearest Georgy" in their many years of written correspondence. There are hints that the relationship may have been sexual, including his gift of a miniature to her on the eve of the Battle of Waterloo, and a pause in their written correspondence for ten years after Waterloo. She was also fond of Colonel Frederick Ponsonby whose recovery after Waterloo she fretted over. After she married William FitzGerald-de Ros, 22nd Baron de Ros, with whom she had issue, she resumed corresponding with Wellington until his death 27 years later. 
 Lord Henry Adam Lennox (6 September 17971812), fell overboard from HMS Blake and drowned.
 Lord William Lennox (20 September 179918 February 1881), married first Mary Ann Paton and second Ellen Smith; had issue by the latter.
 Lady Jane Lennox (c. 180027 March 1861), married Laurence Peel and had issue.
 Captain Lord Frederick Lennox (24 January 180125 October 1829).
 Lord Sussex Lennox (11 June 180212 April 1874), married Hon. Mary Lawless and had issue.
 Lady Louisa Maddelena Lennox (2 October 18032 March 1900), married Rt. Hon. William Tighe, died without issue.
 Lady Charlotte Lennox (c. 180420 August 1833), married Maurice Berkeley, 1st Baron FitzHardinge of Bristol, and had issue.
 Lt.-Col. Lord Arthur Lennox (2 October 180615 January 1864), married Adelaide Campbell and had issue.
 Lady Sophia Georgiana Lennox (21 July 180917 January 1902), married Lord Thomas Cecil, died without issue.

References

Notes

Bibliography
 Harry Altham, A History of Cricket, Volume 1 (to 1914), George Allen & Unwin, 1962.
 Derek Birley, A Social History of English Cricket, Aurum, 1999.
 Rowland Bowen, Cricket: A History of its Growth and Development, Eyre & Spottiswoode, 1970.
 G. B. Buckley, Fresh Light on 18th Century Cricket, Cotterell, 1935.
 Arthur Haygarth, Scores & Biographies, Volume 1 (1744–1826), Lillywhite, 1862.
 J. G. Millingen, The History of Duelling, Volume 2, London: Richard Bentley, 1841.
 John Nyren, The Cricketers of my Time (ed. Ashley Mote), Robson, 1998.
 David Underdown, Start of Play, Allen Lane, 2000.
 H. T. Waghorn, The Dawn of Cricket, Electric Press, 1906.
 Bill Wasik and Monica Murphy, Rabid: A Cultural History of the World's Most Diabolical Virus, Penguin Group, 2012
 Eric Arthur, Toronto, No Mean City (Third Edition, rev. and ed. Stephen A. Otto), University of Toronto Press, 1986.
Lord's 1787–1945 by Sir Pelham Warner .
 Woods, Shirley E. Jr. Ottawa: The Capital of Canada, Toronto: Doubleday Canada, 1980. .

External links
Biography at the Dictionary of Canadian Biography Online
Cricket Archive page on Charles Lennox
Cricinfo page on Charles Lennox
Journey To Nationhood, 150 Years in Canada's Capital
Archives of Charles Lennox, 4th Duke of Richmond and Lennox (Charles Lennox, 4th Duke of Richmond and family collection, R2338) are held at Library and Archives Canada

1764 births
1819 deaths
Deaths from rabies
British Army generals
British Army personnel of the French Revolutionary Wars
British Army personnel of the Napoleonic Wars
British duellists
304
204
Charles
English cricketers
English cricketers of 1701 to 1786
English cricketers of 1787 to 1825
Governors of British North America
Knights of the Garter
Lord-Lieutenants of Sussex
Lords Lieutenant of Ireland
Marylebone Cricket Club cricketers
Members of the Parliament of the United Kingdom for English constituencies
35th Regiment of Foot officers
Surrey cricketers
Lennox, Charles
Lennox, Charles
Richmond, D4
Infectious disease deaths in Ontario
Neurological disease deaths in Ontario
Persons of National Historic Significance (Canada)
Scottish cricketers
Hampshire cricketers
English amateur cricketers
White Conduit Club cricketers
Surrey and Marylebone Cricket Club cricketers
Gentlemen of England cricketers
Burials at Chichester Cathedral
Cricket patrons
People from Moray
Dukes of Aubigny